Vasum cassiforme, common name the helmet vase, is a species of medium to large sea snail, a marine gastropod mollusk in the family Turbinellidae.

Distribution
Vasum cassiforme lives in the southeastern and northeastern littoral of Brazil, including Abrolhos and the Brazilian states of Rio Grande do Norte, Paraíba, Pernambuco, Alagoas, Sergipe, Bahia and Espírito Santo.

Shell description
The maximum reported size of this species shell is 114.9 mm.

Vasum cassiforme has a large, thick and heavy shell, presenting 8 whorls. One of its most striking characteristics is its rich ornamentation, with foliated cords and spines over the body whorl and shoulder, respectively. It is colored cream or light brown externally, while the aperture may be colored purplish-brown.

Ecology

Habitat
This sea snail lives on sand and muddy bottoms, to a depth of 70 m.

References

cassiforme
Gastropods described in 1841